The Zenobia Pas de Deux is a ballet made by George Balanchine, subsequently co-founder and founding choreographer of the New York City Ballet for Richard Rodgers's 1936 musical On Your Toes, in which it was performed under the title La Princesse Zenobia Ballet. Balanchine parodies such Oriental-style ballets as Schéhérazade. The City Ballet premiere took place on Tuesday, November 23, 1993, at the New York State Theater, Lincoln Center.

Casts

Original
 Tamara Geva
 Demetrios Vilan
 William Baker
 George Church

NYCB
 Darci Kistler 
 Igor Zelensky

Reviews
 NY Times review by Brooks Atkinson, April 13, 1936
 NY Times review by Anna Kisselgoff, November 25, 1993

Ballets by George Balanchine
New York City Ballet repertory
1936 ballet premieres
1993 ballet premieres